The Code of Conduct for the Protection of Children from Sexual Exploitation in Travel and Tourism ("The Code") is an international organization composed of representatives from the tourism industry and children's rights experts. The Code's mission is to provide the structure and tools to combat the sexual exploitation of children in the tourism industry. The key aspect of The Code is a set of six criteria that tourism companies can adopt for implementation. Participating companies work with The Code to implement the six criteria to reduce the occurrence of child sexual exploitation.

History 
After the 1996 First World Congress against the Commercial Sexual Exploitation of Children in Stockholm, ECPAT Sweden in collaboration with Nordic tour operators, developed the Code of Conduct for the Protection of Children from Commercial Sexual Exploitation in Travel and Tourism as a project in 1998. With support of UNICEF and UNWTO,)

Since 2004, the Code has operated as an independent international organization but maintain close ties with the ECPAT International network as many national ECPAT members work to promote the Code as Local Code Representatives. Currently, The Code secretariat is based in Bangkok, Thailand.

Objectives 
There are six criteria that form the guiding principles of The Code, and participating companies are expected to fulfill each of them. The criteria are as follows: establish a policy regarding child sex exploitation; train personnel; integrate anti-exploitation clauses into supplier contracts; educate clients about child exploitation by making relevant information available on the company premises; enlist the help of specified "key persons" who offer their expertise on the subject of combating sexual exploitation; and report annual progress toward these goals (Source: Office of the High Commissioner for Human Rights / OHCHR

Participation in The Code is solicited on a voluntary basis. As such, companies that become members of the Code are not legally bound to adhere to the six criteria; instead, these criteria are intended to serve as a road map that enables companies to fulfill their ethical and social responsibilities to the countries in which they operate.

Members 
As of February 24, 2013, more than 1,000 travel and hospitality companies from 42 different countries had signed The Code, agreeing to uphold its principles and work towards fulfilling the six essential criteria. Since 2011, many leading names in the tourism industry — including Delta Air Lines, Wyndham Worldwide and Hilton Worldwide — have begun to show their engagement by signing on with The Code. As a result, the staff of these companies receive training that allows them to identify signs of child exploitation among their guests and create a general environment of awareness in their facilities ). Other signatories of The Code include Accor, the Kuoni Group and TUI Travel.

References 

International non-profit organizations
Organizations based in Bangkok
Non-profit organizations based in Thailand